Rodolfo "Rudy" Castro Fariñas, Sr. (born September 5, 1951) is a Filipino politician and the former Majority Floor Leader of the House of Representatives of the Philippines and represents the 1st District of Ilocos Norte, the Philippines. Fariñas was the last person to serve as governor of Ilocos Norte who was not related to the Marcos family.

Early life and education
Fariñas was born on September 5, 1951. In 1971, he obtained a Bachelor of Arts (AB) degree from Ateneo de Manila University. He studied law and graduated from the Ateneo de Manila Law School in 1978. He placed 8th in the 1978 Philippine Bar Examinations with an 89.90% bar rating.

Career

Fariñas was elected as City Mayor of Laoag in the election of January 30, 1980, at the age of 28 making him one of the youngest elected city mayors in the Philippines. During his administration, Laoag City underwent an infrastructural face-lift as more projects were implemented. The city government was also administered more closely which resulted in an increase in its revenues. Fariñas's prominence increased in the national scene after the 1986 People Power Revolution when the people of Laoag rallied to reject any efforts by the government to replace him as the city mayor.

Rudy was elected in as provincial governor of Ilocos Norte in the 1988 local election where he won in a landslide victory. He was elected again in 1992 and 1995 serving for ten consecutive years. During his term, Fariñas held various posts and chairmanships like national president of JAYCEES, regional chairman of Ilocos Region Peace and Order Council (RPOC) and Reserve Officer's League of the Philippines (ROLP). He also received various awards and commendations, most important of which were the Most Outstanding Provincial Governor, 1988, and Most Outstanding Governor Award of the Year, 1996.

Fariñas actively participated in rescue operations when calamities battered the province. With his program “Rang-ay ti Barangay”, he delivered the government's programs and services to the most remote areas of the province. Governor Fariñas tackled issues in the fields of education, health, agriculture, sports, tourism and peace and order by directing to create the Department of Public Safety which responded to medical emergencies, erect a new hospital building at the Gov. Roque Ablan Hospital, construct the Centennial Arena and Olympic size swimming pool, establish the Capitol Day care Center, restore the Rizal Amusement Park and implement infrastructure projects in various parts of the province. During his administration, the insurgency problem of the province was reduced significantly, promoting peace and security in the province.

After completing his three consecutive terms as governor of the province, Fariñas won a seat to serve Ilocos Norte as First District congressman in the 1998 local polls.

In September 2017, Fariñas stated the members of the Congress should be immune from apprehension when committing minor traffic violations. This was backed by the Metropolitan Manila Development Authority (MMDA). He stated that they should be exempted as this will aid them in doing their job as lawmakers.

Personal life
Rep. Fariñas was married to the commercial model turned actress Maria Teresa L. Gerodias Carlson from Zambales who bore him six children including Ria Christina. Prior to Carlson, he has two children with Janet Murff: Rica Camille and Rey Carlos. Due to alleged cases of domestic violence, Carlson committed suicide on November 23, 2001. Her death became the foundation of Republic Act 9262 or the Anti-Violence Against Women and Children Act. Fariñas denies the accusations. On November 15, 2015, Fariñas's 20-year-old son, Rodolfo Fariñas Jr., died in a motorcycle accident in Bacarra.

References

|-

|-

|-

1951 births
Living people
Members of the House of Representatives of the Philippines from Ilocos Norte
Majority leaders of the House of Representatives of the Philippines
Governors of Ilocos Norte
Mayors of places in Ilocos Norte
People from Laoag
Ateneo de Manila University alumni
Nacionalista Party politicians
PDP–Laban politicians